The War of the Worlds (1898) is a science fiction novel by H. G. Wells. It describes the memoirs of an unnamed narrator in the suburbs of Woking, Surrey, England, who recounts an invasion of Earth by an army of Martians with military technology far in advance to human science. It is said to be the first story that details a human conflict with, and overall defeat by, an extraterrestrial race.

Following its publication, The War of the Worlds rapidly entered popular culture. Through the 20th and 21st centuries, the novel has been adapted in various media, including radio, television and film. These have been produced with varying degrees of faithfulness to the original text, with many of the more famous adaptations, such as Orson Welles' 1938 radio adaptation and the 2005 film directed by Steven Spielberg, choosing to set the events in a contemporary setting. In addition, many adaptations, including both of the Americanised above, relocated the location from its original setting of the United Kingdom in favour of the United States. The most recent adaptation of this type was produced in Canada and broadcast on Britain's BBC (autumn 2013) and BBC America (summer 2014) for the centenary of World War I. It posits the Martian invasion as The Great Martian War 1913–1917, with the Martians invading Earth, first falling on Germany, and then expanding their war on mankind throughout Western Europe.

Films

Adaptions
Theatrical
1953: The War of the Worlds (1953 film), produced by George Pal and directed by Byron Haskin, for Paramount Pictures
2005: War of the Worlds (2005 film), directed by Steven Spielberg, also for Paramount Pictures

Direct-to-video:
1981: The War of the Worlds: Next Century, a Polish film by Piotr Szulkin
2005: H. G. Wells' The War of the Worlds (Pendragon Pictures film), directed by Timothy Hines, for Pendragon Pictures
2005: H. G. Wells' War of the Worlds (The Asylum film), directed by David Michael Latt (titled Invasion or The Worlds in War internationally), for The Asylum.
2008: War of the Worlds 2: The Next Wave, sequel to The Asylum's film, directed by C. Thomas Howell
2012: Alien Dawn: based very loosely on H. G. Wells' The War of the Worlds set in Los Angeles, Directed by Neil Johnson
2012: War of the Worlds - The True Story a sci-fi/horror mockumentary, by Pendragon Pictures
2012: War of the Worlds: Goliath: Animated sequel set 15 years after the Wells novel

Television Movies:
1975: The Night That Panicked America, a film that follows Orson Welles' radio broadcast based on Wells' novel.

Parodies, homages, imitations
1990: Spaced Invaders, a comic film directed by Patrick Read Johnson in which Martians land in a small Illinois town at the same time as the local radio station is rebroadcasting Orson Welles' radio drama.
1996: Mars Attacks!, a science fiction comedy by Tim Burton, which spoofs many alien invasion films of the 1950s, including 1953's The War of the Worlds.
1996: Independence Day is a sci-fi action film that, in addition to dealing with a similar large scale invasion of earth by extraterrestrials, pays homage by having a computer virus be that which disrupts the aliens, an update to the pathogens that caused the downfall of the aliens in the original Wells' work.
2006: Scary Movie 4, a spoof comedy that uses Steven Spielberg's film version as its plot.
2017: Brave New Jersey, a comedy about a New Jersey town impacted by the Orson Welles broadcast.
 In Dennis Wheatley's WWII spy thriller They Used Dark Forces, the protagonist Gregory Sallust manages to infiltrate Hitler's bunker in the final months of the war, gain the German dictator's confidence and convince him that he is fated to be reincarnated as a Martian and lead a Martian conquest of Earth - and enthralled by that expected future, Hitler is content to commit suicide rather than try to resort to guerrilla war and prolong the fighting by another year.

Television
1957: Studio One: Episode "The Night America Trembled", based on the Orson Welles' Mercury Players performance of a radio play version of H.G. Wells' War of the Worlds on 30 October 1938.                          
1988: War of the Worlds: Loosely based on Wells' novel, but is mainly a sequel to the 1953 film.
1993: a planned animated series to be produced by New World Action Animation, a sister division to New World Animation Limited (formerly Marvel Productions) and subsidiary of New World Entertainment
2001: Justice League: an animated TV series adapts the main events and visuals of the novel for the three part story Secret Origins. Aliens, after destroying Mars, attack Earth via tripods and a team of superheroes, including Superman, attempt to stop them
2006: The Simpsons "Treehouse of Horror XVII" episode, "The Day the Earth Looked Stupid" takes the idea of the mass panic, but in the end once everyone realizes it was a hoax and they won't fall for it again, it turns out that aliens Kang and Kodos have successfully invaded Earth. The episode ends with the two aliens confused as to why they weren't hailed as the liberators of Earth, after destroying Springfield.
2013: The Great Martian War 1913–1917, a science fiction docudrama told in the format of an episode on the History Channel on the centennial of the first year of the War To End All Wars. 
2019: The War of the Worlds: A three-part BBC adaptation set in Edwardian England.
2019–22: War of the Worlds: A twenty-four-episode Fox and Studio Canal adaptation set in contemporary Europe.

Radio
1938: The War of the Worlds (radio), the Orson Welles' 1938 radio adaptation, script by Howard E. Koch.
1944: War of the Worlds radio broadcast, Santiago.
1949: War of the Worlds radio broadcast, Radio Quito, Quito, Ecuador.
1950: The War of the Worlds, BBC radio dramatisation adapted from the novel by Jon Manchip White, 6 episodes.
1955: The Lux Radio Theater: War of the Worlds, adaptation of the 1953 film.
1967: The War of the Worlds, BBC radio dramatisation using the 1950 Jon Manchip White script, 6 episodes.
1968: The War of the Worlds (radio 1968), WKBW radio adaptation.
1971: War of the Worlds radio broadcast, Rádio Difusora, São Luís, Brazil.
1988: The War of the Worlds, an NPR 50th Anniversary radio adaptation with Jason Robards, using a slightly updated version of the Howard E. Koch script.
1998: Orson the Alien, episode of Seeing Ear Theater, radio comedy/drama, broadcast 30 October 1998, including audio snippets from Orson Welles' 1938 broadcast.
2002: The War of the Worlds, Glenn Beck's Mercury Radio Arts recreates the 1938 program live on Halloween 2002, using the exact Howard E. Koch script. The program was sponsored by Bill's Khakis.
2005: La Guerra de los Mundos, radio broadcast, Rock & Pop, Santiago, Chile, broadcast as promotion of the 2005 movie.
2017: The War of the Worlds, BBC radio dramatization adapted from the novel by Melissa Murray, 2 episodes.
2018: The Coming of the Martians, a faithful audio dramatisation of the original 1897 story by Sherwood Sound Studios starring Colin Morgan and produced in 5.1 surround sound.
2018: The Martian Invasion of Earth, an audio drama adaptation for Big Finish Productions, adapted by Nicholas Briggs, and starring Richard Armitage and Lucy Briggs-Owen.
2019: The Day Of The Martians, book #1 of The Martian Diaries trilogy by H.E. Wilburson. An audio dramatisation sequel to 'The War Of The Worlds' with original music by H.E.Wilburson. First broadcast in May and June 2019 by Radio Woking.

Music
1978: Jeff Wayne's Musical Version of The War of the Worlds, by Jeff Wayne
2009: War of the Worlds, by Marc Broude
2012: Jeff Wayne's Musical Version of The War of the Worlds - The New Generation, by Jeff Wayne
2017: War of the Worlds, an opera by Annie Gosfield, commissioned by the Los Angeles Philharmonic
2018: War of the Worlds, Pt. 1, by Michael Romeo
2022: War of the Worlds, Pt. 2, by Michael Romeo

Game
 1978: The octopus-like aliens of  Space Invaders were inspired by Wells' Martians, as game designer Tomohiro Nishikado was a fan of the novel.
 1979; 1982: The War of the Worlds (arcade game), an arcade game published by Cinematronics, and its re-released color version.
 1980: The War of the Worlds, a war board game designed by Allen D. Eldridge and published by Task Force Games.
 1984: The War of the Worlds (1984 computer game), a home computer game based on Jeff Wayne's Musical Version of The War of the Worlds.
 1998: Jeff Wayne's The War of the Worlds, real-time strategy computer game.
 1999: Jeff Wayne's The War of the Worlds, vehicular combat PlayStation game.
 2011: The War of the Worlds, a 2D action/platform game narrated by Patrick Stewart.
 2020: Grey Skies: A War of the Worlds Story, a stealth adventure game created by Steel Arts Software where you play as Harper as she tries to survive the invasion.
 TBA: A video game, simply called War of The Worlds, based on the 2005 Film, is currently in development.

Comic books
 1946–1947: Edgar P. Jacobs produced an adaptation in the pages of the Le Journal de Tintin. An album released in 1986 was published by Dargaud.
 1955: Classics Illustrated #124, a comic book adaptation of the book
 1973–1976: Amazing Adventures #18–39 featured Killraven, a 21st-century freedom fighter against a second Martian invasion.
 1977: Marvel Classics Comics #14, a comic book adaptation of the book.
 1978: Waldemar Andrzejewski's 20-page comic book adaptation of the novel, written in Polish by J. Mielczarek.
 1990: Sherlock Holmes in the Case of the Missing Martian published by Eternity (comics), is set in 1908, in the aftermath of the failed invasion.  The story links the theft of the body of a dead Martian from the British Museum, fears of a second invasion, a plot by Professor Moriarty, and Holmes's retirement occupation in beekeeping.
 1999: Superman: War of the Worlds: events of the Wells book transferred to Superman's Metropolis and also involve Lois Lane and Lex Luthor.
2002–2003: Volume II of The League of Extraordinary Gentlemen, a limited series comic book written by Alan Moore and illustrated by Kevin O'Neill
2006: H.G. Wells' The War of the Worlds (comic), graphic novel
 2002 – present: Scarlet Traces, a sequel to the novel appearing in 2000 AD written by Ian Edginton and illustrated by D'Israeli.
 2018: H. G. Wells: The War of the Worlds published by Insight Comics.

Other
1994: War of the Worlds: Invasion from Mars, an Audio Theatre adaption by L.A. Theatre Works, casting Star Trek cast members like Leonard Nimoy, Gates McFadden, Brent Spiner and directed by John de Lancie.
2004–2005: H.G. Wells' The War of the Worlds, a site specific theatre adaptation by Canadian playwright Ian Case staged in and around Craigdarroch Castle in Victoria, British Columbia.
2005: The Art of H. G. Wells by Ricardo Garijo, the third in the series of trading cards, released
2008: Solar Pons's War of the Worlds, an online web serial set in the world of Solar Pons, combining elements of the original novel, the 1938 radio adaptation, and the Wells short-story The Crystal Egg.
2017: War of the Worlds 2017, a mixed web media story primarily told through Twitter, centered on a modern group of characters while retaining concepts from the original novel.
2017: The Day Of The Martians, book #1 of The Martian Diaries trilogy by H.E.Wilburson. An audio dramatisation sequel to 'The War Of The Worlds' with original music by H.E.Wilburson.
2019: Lake On The Moon, book #2 of The Martian Diaries trilogy by H.E.Wilburson. An audio dramatisation sequel to 'The War Of The Worlds' with original music by H.E.Wilburson.

1938 radio adaption by Orson Welles

Orson Welles's 1938 radio broadcast on The Mercury Theatre on the Air purportedly caused public outcry, as many listeners believed that an actual Martian invasion was in progress, although the reality of the panic is disputed as the program had relatively few listeners.

The radio drama itself has spun off a number of productions based upon the events surrounding the broadcast, including Doctor Who: Invaders from Mars, an audio drama released in 2002 based upon the Doctor Who television series that depicts Welles's broadcast as taking place during an actual attempted alien invasion.

1953 first film adaptation by George Pal

George Pal's film adaptation has many notable differences from H. G. Wells' novel. The closest resemblance is probably that of the antagonists. The film's aliens are indeed Martians, and invade Earth for the same reasons as those from the novel (the state of Mars suggests that it is in the final stages of being able to support life, leading to the Martians decision to make Earth their new home). They land on Earth in the same way, by crashing to the Earth. However, the book's spacecraft are large cylinder-shaped projectiles fired from the Martian surface from some kind of cannon, instead of the film's meteor-like spaceships; but the Martians emerge from their craft in the same way, by unscrewing a large, round hatch. They appear to have no use for humans in the film. In the novel they are observed directly feeding on humans by draining their victims' blood using pipettes; there is also a speculation about them eventually using human slaves to hunt down all remaining human survivors after the Martians conquer Earth. In the film the Martians do not bring the novel's fast-growing red weed with them, but they are defeated by Earth microorganisms, as observed in the novel. However, they die from the effects of the microorganisms within three days of the landing of the first meteor-ship; in the novel the Martians die within about three weeks of their invasion of England.
	  	
The Martians themselves bear no physical resemblance to the novel's Martians. The novel's aliens are bear-sized, bulky creatures whose bodies are described as "merely heads", with a beak-like mouth, sixteen tentacles and two "luminous, disk-like eyes". Their film counterparts are short, reddish-brown creatures with two long, thin arms with three long suction cup-like fingers. The Martian's "head," if it can be called that, is a broad "face" at the top-front of its broad shouldered upper torso, the only apparent feature of which is a single large eye with three distinctly colored lenses. The Martians' lower extremities, whatever they may be, are never shown. (Some speculative designs for the creature suggest the idea of three thin legs resembling their fingers, while others show them as a biped with short, stubby legs with three-toed feet.)
	  	
The film's Martian war machines do actually have more of a resemblance than they may seem at first glance. The book's machines are Tripods and carry the heat-ray projector on an articulated arm connected to the front of the war machine's main body. The film's machines are deliberately shaped like manta rays, with a bulbous, elongated green window at the front, through which the aliens observe their surroundings. On top of the machine is the cobra-like heat-ray attached to a long, narrow, neck-like extension. They can be mistaken for flying-machines, but Dr. Forrester states that they are lifted by "invisible legs"; in one scene, when the first machine emerges, you can see faint traces of three energy legs beneath and three sparking traces where the three energy shafts touch the burning ground. Therefore, technically speaking, the film's war machines are indeed tripods, though they are never given that designation. Whereas the novel's war machines had no protection against artillery, the film's war machines have a force field surrounding them; this invisible shield is described by Dr. Forrester as a "protective blister".
	 	
The Martian weaponry is also partially unchanged. The heat-ray has the very same effect as that of the novel. However, the novel's heat-ray is briefly described as having a spinning disk held up by a mechanical arm when first seen; it fires in a wide arc while still in the pit where the Martians first land. The film's heat-ray is shaped like a cobra's hood with a single, red pulsing eye, which possibly acts like a targeting telescope for the Martians. The book describes another weapon, the black smoke used to kill all life; the war machines fire projectiles containing a black powder through a bazooka-like tube accessory. The black powder when dispersed seems to have the same effect on life as the mustard gas of the First World War. This weapon is replaced in the film by the "skeleton beam", which fires green pulsing bursts of energy from the tips of the Manta-Ray body. The skeleton beams cause objects and people to disintegrate.
	 	
The plot of the film is very different from the novel. The novel tells the story of a late 19th-century journalist who journeys through Victorian London and environs while the Martians attack, eventually being reunited with his wife; the film's protagonist is a California scientist who falls in love with a college instructor after the Martian attack begins. However, certain points of the plot are similar to the novel, from the crash-landing of the Martian meteor-ships to their eventual defeat by Earth's microorganisms. Doctor Forrester also goes through some of which befalls the book's narrator: like his ordeal in a destroyed house and seeing an actual Martian up close. The film is given more of a Cold War theme, with its use of the Atomic Bomb against the enemy and the mass-destruction that such a global war would inflict on mankind.

Unreleased adaptations
After the Second World War, Ray Harryhausen shot a scene of a dying alien falling out of a Martian war machine, as test footage for an abandoned project to adapt the story using Wells' original "octopus" concept for the Martians. A video of the original footage can be found on YouTube.

Here Harryhausen talked about his proposed adaptation:

"Yes, originally, after Mighty Joe [Young] I made a lot of sketches for War of the Worlds. I wanted to keep it in the period that H.G. Wells wrote it, of the Victorian period, and I made eight big drawings, some of which are published – in the book and it would have been an interesting picture, if it was made years ago. But since then so many pictures of that nature have been made that it wouldn't be quite unique as it would have been."

Sequels by other authors
Within six weeks of the novel's original 1897 magazine serialisation, The Boston Post began running a sequel, Edison's Conquest of Mars by Garrett P. Serviss, about an Earth counter-attack against the Martians, led by Thomas Edison. Though this is actually a sequel to 'Fighters from Mars', a revised and un-authorised re-print, they both were first printed in the Boston Post in 1898.
The War of the Wenuses by E. V. Lucas and C. L. Graves (1898) is a parody of Wells's novel. In it London is invaded by Venusian women intent on raiding major department stores, notably Whiteley's. They can render men insensible using a 'mash-glance' (a 'masher' was period slang for an attractive young woman), so London's womenfolk resist them instead.
In 1962, Soviet author Lazar Lagin published a political pamphlet named "Major Well Andyou" ("Майор Велл Эндъю"), a pun on "Well, and you?", which relates the story of a major in the British Army who collaborates with the Martian invaders. Lagin used the story to express current trends of communist thought in the Soviet Union, and injected analysis of political issues contemporary to the 1950s and 1960s.
The Second War of the Worlds, by George H. Smith concerned the Martians trying to invade an alternate, less-technologically advanced Earth. Helping these people are an unnamed English detective, and his companion, a doctor, from 'our' world. (It is quite obvious from clues in the story that these are actually Sherlock Holmes and Dr. John Watson.)
In the 1970s, Marvel Comics had a character named Killraven, Warrior of the Worlds who (in an alternative timeline) fought H. G. Wells' Martians after their second invasion of Earth in 2001. He first appeared in Amazing Adventures volume 2 #18.
Manly Wade Wellman and his son Wade Wellman wrote Sherlock Holmes' War of the Worlds (1975) which describes Sherlock Holmes's adventures during the Martian occupation of London. This version uses Wells' short story "The Crystal Egg" as a prequel (with Holmes being the man who bought the egg at the end) and includes a crossover with Arthur Conan Doyle's Professor Challenger stories. Among many changes the Martians are changed into simple vampires, who suck and ingest human blood.
 In The Space Machine Christopher Priest presents both a sequel and prequel to The War of the Worlds (due to time travel elements), which also integrates the events of The Time Machine.
In the novel W. G. Grace's Last Case (1984) by Willie Rushton, W. G. Grace and Doctor Watson avert a second Martian invasion by attacking the Martian fleet on the far side of the moon with "bombs" containing influenza germs.
The comic book Scarlet Traces (2002) begins a decade later with Great Britain utilising the Martians' technology, and ironic to the allegory of Wells' novel, have become more powerful because of it. Eventually, this leads up to a counter-invasion aimed for Mars in its own sequel, Scarlet Traces: The Great Game (2006).
Science fiction author Eric Brown wrote a short story, "Ulla, Ulla" (2002) about an expedition to Mars, finding the truth behind H.G. Wells' novel.
The London Pen (La cage de Londres, 2003), by French-Canadian author Jean-Pierre Guillet, takes place one hundred years after a second successful Martian invasion. Humans are penned like cattle and «milked» regularly by their new masters, who feed on their blood. 
Andrew Norris published Solar Pons' War of the Worlds in The Solar Pons Gazette (Volume 3.1, December 2008, pp. 19–33). In it Solar Pons, the Sherlock Holmes pastiche detective created by August Derleth, is involved, along with H.G. Wells, in a Martian invasion in 1938.
C. A, Powell's The Last Days of Thunder Child: Victorian Britain in chaos! (2013) tells the story from the perspective of the crew of HMS Thunder Child, here a pre-dreadnought rather than the torpedo ram in the original novel. A sequel, The Last Days of the Fighting Machine: The Martian Apocalypse of Victorian Britain (2019), tells the story of the fightback once the Martians start being weakened by disease, showing a variety of points of view, including members of the crew of a French warship.
Mike Brunton's War of the Worlds: The Anglo-Martian War of 1895 (Dark Osprey Book 9) is a 2015 pseudo-factual military history of the Martian invasion by a respected military history publisher. It sets the war at the time Wells wrote the novel, rather than in the early 20th century as specified by Wells in his book.
A number of people have written contemporaneously set stories that describe the same invasion from the perspectives of locations other than Britain. Notable stories of this type are:
 "Night of the Cooters" by Howard Waldrop, in which a Martian war machine lands in Texas.
 "Foreign Devils" by Walter Jon Williams, set in China.
War of the Worlds: Global Dispatches, edited by Kevin J. Anderson, an anthology of such stories.
War of the Worlds: New Millennium (2005) by Douglas Niles in which the invasion is set in 2005 and focuses mainly on the American fightback. Tor Books
 Kevin J. Anderson (writing as Gabriel Mesta) later wrote The Martian War: A Thrilling Eyewitness Account of the Recent Invasion As Reported by Mr. H.G. Wells (2006). It recounts the Martian invasion from a variety of viewpoints, and has ties to Wells's other work.
In the short story Mastery of Vesania, Hayden Lee uses his appropriation to present the invasion from the perspective of the Martian invaders, also providing the link between the different nature of the two invasions presented in the book and the 2005 film (arriving from space and rising from the ground).
Steffen König wrote a prequel entitled Die Dämonen vom Ullswater, (The Demons of Ullswater) published 2014 by Wurdack Verlag Germany. Set in 1894, the protagonist, a young lawyer from London, encounters an early scouting party of the Martians near lake Ullswater in Cumberland, UK.
Scott Washburn has written five novels between 2016 and 2019, starting with The Great Martian War: Invasion, about a second Martian invasion in 1909 and the resultant battlefronts. Much of this is set in the USA.
 The New York Times best selling author, Stephen Baxter, has a novel-length sequel; entitled The Massacre of Mankind, released on 19 January 2017. He has also written a novella entitled The Martian in the Wood (also 2017).
Mark Gardner and John J. Rust's War of the Worlds: Retaliation (2017) posits a human invasion of Mars in 1924, using captured Martian technology and led by historical characters including George Patton, Erwin Rommel, Charles de Gaulle and Georgy Zhukov.
Indie author D.G.Leigh has written two novellas. "Sherlock Holmes Vs The War of the Worlds" (2015). The original Wells' invasion as experienced by Mr Sherlock Holmes and Dr John Watson. The second publication takes places twenty years later. This time the protagonist is the teenage son of the Journalist living in the Artilleryman's subterranean metropolis. The title of this story is identical to Stephen Baxter's official release "The Massacre of Mankind" (2017).
The Martian Diaries trilogy by H.E.Wilburson, a sequel to 'The War Of The Worlds', continues in 1913 with original characters facing a new Martian invasion and a terrible doomsday weapon in book #1 'The Day Of The Martians'. A sinister discovery in 1919 in book #2 'Lake On The Moon', reveals that our planet is in great peril from Red Weed first brought to Earth by the Martians. Following in the footsteps of the astronomer Ogilvy, Jack Stent adds to 'The Martian Diaries', as he embarks on a desperate space mission to find a cure for the Martian plague in book #3 'Gateway To Mars'.
The 2019 speculative fiction book Spacecraft of the First World War: A Compendium of Fighting Vessels of the Great Powers by William Flogg details a fictional alternate history stemming from the aftermath of the Martian invasion. Documented in the style of a fictional vessel encyclopedia, the book details the next few decades after the invasion, as humanity discovers the abandoned life support and anti-gravity devices used by the Martians to survive the transit to Earth and reverse-engineers the technology to create interplanetary warships, and the effects this had on history--namely, the events of the First World War which, in light of the new advancements in technology spreads beyond terrestrial Earth and into the solar system. and humanity's attempts to explore space despite the conflict.
 In Robert Heinlein's The Number of the Beast the protagonists visit several different versions of Mars. One of them is the home planet of the Martians who invaded Earth and who in this alterante history managed to hold on to their conquest. The protagonists encounter tribes of humans living in the Martian wilds, descendants of captive humans who had been transported to Mars by the conquerors and there managed to escape. Also on Mars, the wild humans still speak Cockney English — while the Martians' obedient slaves seem descended mainly from upper-class Englishmen.
 In a loose way, John Christopher's Tripods trilogy can also be considered a sequel to War of the Worlds since it depicts the Earth under the rule of invaders from space who move about on giant tripods, and the struggle of Humanity to get free of them - though in Christopher's version the invaders come from much further away than Mars, and are different in many crucial ways from Wells' Martians.

References

 
War of the Worlds